The Shawnee Summer Theatre, commonly known as Shawnee, is a theatre in the rural community of Bloomfield, Greene County, Indiana. It has been running continuously since 1960.

External links
 
 Visit Greene County - Shawnee Summer Theatre

Theatres in Indiana
Tourist attractions in Greene County, Indiana